Leptocarpha is a genus of flowering plants in the family Asteraceae.

Species
There is only one known species, Leptocarpha rivularis, native to the La Araucania Region of Chile.

References

Monotypic Asteraceae genera
Heliantheae
Endemic flora of Chile